No Fixed Address or no fixed address may refer to:

 No fixed abode, referring to people having no fixed geographic location for their residence
 No Fixed Address (band), an Australian Aboriginal reggae rock group formed in 1979
 No Fixed Address (album), a 2014 album by Nickelback
 No Fixed Address Tour, a 2014–16 tour by Nickelback associated with the album